Cotinis mutabilis, also known as the figeater beetle (also green fruit beetle or fig beetle), is a member of the scarab beetle family. It belongs to the subfamily Cetoniinae, comprising a group of beetles commonly called flower chafers since many of them feed on pollen, nectar, or petals. Its habitat is primarily the southwestern United States (including California) and Mexico. Figeater beetles are often mistaken for green June beetles (Cotinis nitida) and occasionally Japanese beetles (Popillia japonica), which occur in the eastern US.

Figeater beetle larvae, commonly called "crawly backs", roll on their backs and propel themselves upside down. They are a semi-glossy green on the top and a brilliant iridescent green on the underside and legs. They are active during daylight hours, often congregating in the shade of trees near choice breeding grounds to find mates.

The figeater beetle is native to moister areas of the American southwest, where its natural diet includes fruit from cacti and sap from desert trees. Their range has expanded considerably since the 1960s with the increasing availability of home gardens, compost piles, and organic mulch. The larvae eat decomposing organic matter, such as that found in compost piles, manure piles, and organic mulch, and occasionally plant roots, such as the roots of grass in lawns. The adult's primary food has become fruit in gardens and orchards.

Life cycle 

After mating, eggs are laid in decaying matter or compost piles, which provide sustenance for the emerging larvae. They have six small, ineffectual legs; to move, they roll onto their backs and propel themselves upside down, using the stiff dark hairs on their backs to gain traction. At rest, they curl into a firm C shape.

Pupation occurs in the spring; adults emerge from July to September (varies with location). They are active during daylight hours, often congregating in the shade of trees near choice breeding grounds to find mates. They make a loud buzzing sound similar to that of carpenter bees, possibly because they do not need to open their elytra in order to fly, an ability shared with many other flower beetles.

Taxonomy 
C. mutabilis is often confused with the green June beetle (Cotinis nitida). Both are members of the flower beetle subfamily (Cetoniinae), and are similar in appearance, but the green June beetle is smaller, and its range is in the eastern United States. The only possible crossover of both species is in Texas. They are also occasionally mistaken for Japanese beetles (Popillia japonica), which occur in the eastern US.

Diet 

The figeater beetle is native to moister areas of the American southwest, where its natural diet includes fruit from cacti and sap from desert trees. Their range has expanded considerably since the 1960s with the increasing availability of home gardens, compost piles, and organic mulch. The larvae eat decomposing organic matter, such as that found in compost piles, manure piles, and organic mulch, and occasionally plant roots, such as the roots of grass in lawns.

The adult's primary food has become fruit in gardens and orchards. They prefer sweet food, which includes the leaves, flowers, and saps of some plants and ripe or overripe fruit. Fruit with tough skins are too hard for them to bite through, so they most often eat softer-skinned fruit such as figs, peaches, grapes, pears, and tomatoes, among others. The beetles are particularly attracted to ripening and fermenting fruit, which emit gases that lead the beetles to them, and to fruit that other animals or insects have already damaged. In most small gardens, the adult beetles are minor pests that do little damage; however, they can swarm on soft or damaged fruit and have been known to eat an entire garden grape or fig crop. They are not considered to be an important pest because they do not damage lawns as larvae and trees as much as June beetles or Japanese beetles.

References 

Beetles of North America
Cetoniinae
Beetles described in 1883